Alfred A. McCandless (July 23, 1927  August 9, 2017) was an American businessman, military veteran, and politician who served six terms as a Republican politician from California from 1983 to 1995.

Biography 
McCandless was born in Brawley, Imperial County, California, on July 23, 1927. He attended Los Angeles City schools and received a B.A., University of California at Los Angeles in 1951.

McCandless served in the United States Marine Corps from 1945–1946 and 1950–1952, and attained the rank of captain.

He later worked as an automobile and truck dealer from 1953–1975, and was a member of the Riverside County board of supervisors from 1972–1982 and the Riverside County housing authority from 1974–1982.

Congress 
McCandless was elected as a Republican to the Ninety-eighth and to the five succeeding Congresses (January 3, 1983 – January 3, 1995) and was not a candidate for reelection to the One Hundred Fourth Congress.

Death
McCandless died at his home in La Quinta, California on August 9, 2017 at the age of 90.

References

External links

 Political Graveyard biography

1927 births
2017 deaths
County supervisors in California
People from Brawley, California
People from Riverside County, California
University of California, Los Angeles alumni
Businesspeople from California
Military personnel from California
United States Marines
Republican Party members of the United States House of Representatives from California
20th-century American businesspeople
Burials at Coachella Valley Public Cemetery